Phosphomevalonate kinase is an enzyme in the mevalonate pathway that in humans is encoded by the PMVK gene.

References

External links 
 
 

EC 2.7.4